The swimming competition at the 2003 Afro-Asian Games was contested in straight finals in Hyderabad, India.

Results

Men

Women

References 

2003 Afro-Asian Games
Afro-Asian Games
Swimming
Afro-Asian Games